Bacillus coahuilensis is a rod-shaped, Gram-positive, motile, spore-forming bacterium.  This species was isolated from water samples taken from a highly saline desert lagoon in Coahuila, Mexico.

References

External links
Type strain of Bacillus coahuilensis at BacDive -  the Bacterial Diversity Metadatabase

coahuilensis
Bacteria described in 2008